Abraham Suárez (born 8 April 1968) is an Ecuadorian diver. He competed in the men's 3 metre springboard event at the 1988 Summer Olympics.

References

External links
 

1968 births
Living people
Ecuadorian male divers
Olympic divers of Ecuador
Divers at the 1988 Summer Olympics
Place of birth missing (living people)